Jaroslav Kovář (12 May 1934 – 14 February 2015) was a Czech track and field athlete who competed in the high jump for Czechoslovakia. He was the bronze medallist at the 1954 European Athletics Championships, behind his teammate Jiří Lanský. He was highly successful in student competitions, taking gold at the 1954 World Student Games and a gold and a silver at the World Festival of Youth and Students.

He was a three-time national champion, winning the Czechoslovak title three years straight from 1955 to 1957. He used the eastern cut-off technique pioneered by Michael Sweeney before moving on to the straddle technique. He graduated from Prague's Faculty of Physical Education and Sport and later became an athletics coach. Amongst his charges were national record breakers Jaroslav Alexa, Rudolf Baudis, Josef Hrabal, Jindřich Vondra and Ján Zvara. He was also coach to women's high jumpers Jaroslava Valentová, Alena Prosková and Věra Bradáčová. Later in his career he trained Zuzana Hlavoňová, Tomáš Janků, Svatoslav Ton, Iva Straková and Oldřiška Marešová.

International competitions

National titles
Czechoslovak Athletics Championships
High jump: 1955, 1956, 1957

See also
List of European Athletics Championships medalists (men)

References

1934 births
2015 deaths
Czechoslovak male high jumpers
Czech male high jumpers
European Athletics Championships medalists
Czech athletics coaches